A Burgers material is a viscoelastic material having the properties both of elasticity and viscosity. It is named after the Dutch physicist Johannes Martinus Burgers.

Overview

Maxwell representation 

Given that one Maxwell material has an elasticity  and viscosity , and the other Maxwell material has an elasticity  and viscosity , the Burgers model has the constitutive equation

Kelvin representation 

Given that the Kelvin material has an elasticity  and viscosity , the spring has an elasticity  and the dashpot has a viscosity , the Burgers model has the constitutive equation

Model characteristics

This model incorporates viscous flow into the standard linear solid model, giving a linearly increasing asymptote for strain under fixed loading conditions.

See also
 Generalized Maxwell model
 Kelvin–Voigt material
 Maxwell material
 Standard linear solid model

References

External links
 Creep and Stress Relaxation for Four-Element Viscoelastic Solids and Liquids, Wolfram Demonstrations Project
Non-Newtonian fluids